England competed at the 2022 Commonwealth Games in Birmingham between 28 July and 8 August 2022. Having competed at every Games since their 1930 inauguration, it was England's twenty-second appearance (and third appearance as the host nation).

Following the CGF's decision to revoke Durban's hosting rights, Birmingham was chosen as the English host candidate and submitted its bid. Though originally deemed not fully compliant, adjustments to the bid ensured the city was awarded the hosting rights in December 2017.

Jack Laugher and Emily Campbell were the country's flagbearers during the opening ceremony, and Jake Jarman was the country's flagbearer at the closing ceremony.

Administration
On 19 September 2019, Commonwealth Games England announced that Mark England had been appointed Chef de Mission for the England team in Birmingham. He fulfilled the same role for Team GB at both the 2016 and 2020 Summer Olympics in Rio and Tokyo respectively.

Competitors
The following is the list of number of competitors participating at the Games per sport/discipline.

Medallists

| style="text-align:left; vertical-align:top;"|

Multiple medallists 
The following Team England competitors won multiple medals at the 2022 Commonwealth Games

Athletics

On 5 May 2022, Team England selected two athletes for the marathons. Twenty-one para athletes were added on 19 May 2022, having qualified via the World Para Athletics World Rankings for performances registered between 31 December 2020 and 25 April 2022.

The full squad of ninety-three (with seventy athletes added) was announced on 22 June 2022. Abigail Irozuru was later added following a injury withdrawal from the cycling squad. Thomas Young withdrew from the Games due to an injury. On 24 July 2022, it was announced that Max Burgin had been forced to withdraw from the team after being diagnosed with DVT. It was announced that Jamie Webb and Bianca Williams would replace Burgin and Desiree Henry who had also been obliged to withdraw from the team due to injury. On 27 July, Dina Asher-Smith withdrew from the Games, after having injured herself at the 2022 World Athletics Championships.

Men
Track and road events

Field events

Combined events – Decathlon

Women
Track and road events

Field events

Combined events – Heptathlon

Badminton

As host nation, England automatically qualified for the mixed team event. A full squad of ten players was selected on 20 April 2022. Badminton England announced that Abigail Holden withdrew from the competition due to the knee injury.

Singles

Doubles

Mixed team

Summary

Squad

Marcus Ellis
Callum Hemming
Ben Lane
Toby Penty
Sean Vendy
Chloe Birch
Freya Patel-Redfearn
Jessica Pugh
Lauren Smith

Group stage

Knock-out stage

3x3 basketball

As host nation, England automatically qualified for all four tournaments.

Squad selections were announced on 13 July 2022.

Summary

Men's tournament

Roster
Jamell Anderson
Jaydon Henry-McCalla
Myles Hesson
Orlan Jackman

Group play

Semi-finals

Gold medal match

Women's tournament

Roster
Shanice Beckford-Norton
Cheridene Green
Chantelle Handy
Hannah Jump

Group play

Quarter-finals

Semi-finals

Gold medal match

Men's wheelchair tournament

Roster
Tyler Baines
Lee Manning
Charlie McIntyre
Abderrahim Taghrest

Group play

Semi-finals

Bronze medal match

Women's wheelchair tournament

Roster
Jade Atkin
Amy Conroy
Joy Haizelden
Charlotte Moore

Group play

Semi-finals

Bronze medal match

Beach volleyball

As host nation, England automatically qualified for both the men's and women's tournaments. On 29 May 2022, Team England announced the selection of their beach volleyball pairings.

Men's tournament

Group C

Quarter-finals

Semi-finals

Bronze medal match

Women's tournament

Group C

Quarter-finals

Boxing

On 5 July 2022, Team England announced its squad of fourteen boxers.

Men

Women

Cricket

As host nation, England automatically qualified for the tournament.

Fixtures were announced in November 2021. The squad was announced on 16 July 2022.

Summary

Squad

 Maia Bouchier
 Katherine Brunt
 Alice Capsey
 Kate Cross
 Freya Davies
 Sophia Dunkley
 Sophie Ecclestone
 Sarah Glenn
 Amy Jones
 Freya Kemp
 Heather Knight (c)
 Nat Sciver
 Bryony Smith
 Issy Wong
 Danni Wyatt

Group stage

Semi-finals

Bronze medal match

Cycling

On 15 June 2022, Team England announced its squad of thirty-three cyclists and two pilots, which includes Tokyo 2020 champions Laura Kenny and Matt Walls. The para cyclists were awarded with quota places earned via the UCI Individual Tandem B Track Para Rankings (for performances registered between 1 January 2021 and 18 April 2022).

Lauren Bate later withdrew from the Games owing to injury. On 28 July 2022, it was announced that Ethan Hayter had withdrawn from the Games due to his professional commitments with Ineos Grenadiers and he will be replaced on the track by Will Perrett.

Road
Men

Women

Track
Sprint

Keirin

Time trial

Pursuit

Points race

Scratch race

Mountain Biking

Diving

On 21 June 2022, Team England announced its squad of eighteen divers, including Rio 2016 champion Jack Laugher and Tokyo 2020 champion Matty Lee.

Men

Women

Mixed

Gymnastics

On 23 June 2022, Team England announced its squad of thirteen gymnasts, including former world champion Joe Fraser and four-time Commonwealth Games gold medallist in 2014, Claudia Fragapane.

Artistic
Men
Team Final & Individual Qualification

Individual Finals

Women
Team Final & Individual Qualification

Individual Finals

Rhythmic
Team Final & Individual Qualification

Individual Finals

Hockey

As host nation, England automatically qualified for both the men's and women's tournaments.

Detailed fixtures were released on 9 March 2022. The women's squad was announced on 14 June 2022, followed by the majority of the men's squad on 12 July 2022. On 24 July, it was announced that Ian Sloan and Rhys Smith had been brought into the squad to replace the injured Nick Park and Liam Sanford.

Summary

Men's tournament

Squad

James Albery (co-vc)
Liam Ansell
Nick Bandurak
Will Calnan
David Condon
Brendan Creed
David Goodfield
Chris Griffiths
James Mazarelo (gk)
Ollie Payne (gk)
Phil Roper
Stuart Rushmere
Ian Sloan
Rhys Smith
Tom Sorsby
Zachary Wallace (c)
Jack Waller (co-vc)
Samuel Ward

Group play

Semi-finals

Bronze medal match

Women's tournament

Squad

Giselle Ansley
Grace Balsdon
Fiona Crackles
Sophie Hamilton
Sabbie Heesh (gk)
Maddie Hinch (gk)
Tessa Howard
Holly Hunt
Hannah Martin
Shona McCallin
Lily Owsley
Hollie Pearne-Webb (c)
Flora Peel
Izzy Petter
Ellie Rayer
Anna Toman
Laura Unsworth
Lily Walker

Group play

Semi-finals

Gold medal match

Judo

On 24 June 2022, Team England announced its squad of fourteen judoka. Lele Nairne was subsequently called up to replace Lucy Renshall, who withdrew owing to injury.

Men

Women

Lawn bowls

On 28 January 2022, Team England announced the selection of the lawn bowls team (16 players, 2 directors) to compete in Birmingham. Amy Pharaoh competed at the 2002 Commonwealth Games in Manchester the last time the event was held in England and returns to the team after a twelve year absence.

Men

Women

Para-sport

Netball

As host nation, England automatically qualified for the tournament.

Partial fixtures were announced in November 2021, then updated with the remaining qualifiers in March 2022. The squad was announced on 20 June 2022. On 17 July it was announced that Imogen Allison would replace the injured Beth Cobden.

Summary

Squad

Imogen Allison
Eleanor Cardwell
Jade Clarke
Sophie Drakeford-Lewis
Stacey Francis-Bayman
Layla Guscoth
Jo Harten (vc)
Helen Housby
Laura Malcolm
Geva Mentor
Natalie Metcalf (c)
Eboni Usoro-Brown

Group stage

Semi-finals

Bronze medal match

Para powerlifting

On 25 May 2022, British Weight Lifting announced the seven para powerlifters who have been selected to represent England in Birmingham. On 27 July 2022, it was announced that Louise Sugden had withdrawn from the Games due to injury.

Rugby sevens

As host nation, England automatically qualified for both the men's and women's tournaments. Both squads were confirmed on 6 July 2022.

Summary

Men's tournament

Squad
 
Jamie Adamson
Api Bavadra
Tom Bowen
Blake Boyland
Jamie Barden
Max Clementson
Alex Davis (c)
Tom Emery
Will Homer
Hayden Hyde
Charlton Kerr
Calum Randle
Freddie Roddick

Pool A

9-16 Quarterfinal

9-12 semifinal

9th place match

Women's tournament

Squad
 
Ellie Boatman
Abbie Brown (co-c)
Heather Cowell
Grace Crompton
Merryn Doidge
Megan Jones (co-c)
Alicia Maude
Isla Norman-Bell
Celia Quansah
Jade Shekells
Lauren Torley
Emma Uren
Amy Wilson-Hardy

Pool A

5-8 semifinal

5th place match

Squash

On 6 May 2022, Team England announced its squad of nine players.

Singles

Doubles

Swimming

On 27 January 2022, Team England announced its initial squad of ten swimmers, including double Tokyo 2020 champions Adam Peaty, James Guy and Tom Dean. With the addition of twenty-four swimmers and fourteen para-swimmers (the latter qualifying via the World Para Swimming World Rankings for performances between 31 December 2020 and 18 April 2022), the full squad of forty-eight competitors was confirmed on 11 May 2022.

On 13 July 2022 it was announced that Max Litchfield would be replaced by Toby Robinson.

Men

Women

Mixed

Table tennis

As host nation, England automatically qualified full teams for both the men's and women's events; parasport players had to qualify via the ITTF Para Table Tennis Rankings (as they were on 1 May 2022).

A team of thirteen players (including those in parasport events) was announced on 7 June 2022. On 22 July 2022, it was announced that Emily Bolton would replace the injured Mollie Patterson.

Singles

Doubles

Team

Triathlon

On 25 January 2022, Team England announced its initial squad of four triathletes, including three of the Tokyo 2020 mixed relay champions.

Based on the World Triathlon Para Rankings of 28 March 2022, a squad of four paratriathletes (plus two guides) was subsequently added. Two triathletes, one paratriathlete and three guides were added to the overall squad on 1 July 2022.

Jonny Brownlee later pulled out of the Games as the result of a wrist injury he sustained in a triathlon the previous month. On 17 July it was announced that Dan Dixon would replace Brownlee.

Individual

Mixed relay

Paratriathlon

Weightlifting

As host nation, England automatically qualified 1 entry in each weight category (8 per gender). On 25 May 2022, British Weight Lifting announced the fourteen weightlifters who have been selected to represent England in Birmingham. On 17 July 2022, it was announced that Sarah Davies had been added to the England squad.

Men

Women

Wrestling

On 28 April 2022, Team England announced its squad of nine wrestlers. Myroslav Dykun later withdrew and was replaced by Syerus Eslami as of 10 June 2022.

Repechage Format

References

External links
Birmingham 2022 Commonwealth Games Official site
Commonwealth Games England Official site

England at the Commonwealth Games
Nations at the 2022 Commonwealth Games
2022 in English sport